Burnie is a city of Tasmania, Australia.

Burnie may also refer to:

City of Burnie, a local government body of Tasmania
Electoral district of Burnie, a former electoral district of Tasmania
HMAS Burnie, a Bathurst-class corvette of the Royal Australian Navy
Burnie (mascot), the mascot of the Miami Heat
Burnie (surname), a surname

See also
Bernie (disambiguation)
Burney (disambiguation)